Qaleh Dozdan (also Romanized as Qal‘eh Dozdān; also known as Qal‘eh Yazdān) is a village in Taghenkoh-e Shomali Rural District, Taghenkoh District, Firuzeh County, Razavi Khorasan Province, Iran. At the 2006 census, its population was 1,147, in 290 families.

References 

Populated places in Firuzeh County